The Havanaise in E major, Op. 83, is a composition for violin and orchestra based on the habanera rhythm, written in 1887 by French composer, Camille Saint-Saëns for Cuban violinist Rafael Díaz Albertini.  At the January 7, 1894 orchestral premiere in Paris, the violin was played instead by Martin Pierre Marsick. It is one of the standards of the classical concertante repertoire.

Structure
The composition consists of a single multi-tempo movement marked Allegretto lusinghiero – Allegro – Tempo primo – Allegretto – Allegro non troppo – Più Allegro – Allegretto – Lento and lasts around ten minutes in performance.

In popular culture
A minor variation on "Havanaise", as well as the original piece, make up the main theme of the film The Ninth Gate. A brief segment is played many times on the soundtrack of Rainer Fassbinder's film Effi Briest. The initial phrase also supplies the melody to the popular song Sugartime by Charles Phillips and Odis Echols.

References
Notes

Sources

External links

 Saint-Saëns, Havanaise, Op. 83. Performed by Mohamed Harb and the Cairo Symphony Orchestra.
 Saint-Saëns, Havanaise, Op. 83. Performed by Liviu Prunaru and an unnamed pianist.

Concertos by Camille Saint-Saëns
Saint-Saens
1887 compositions
Compositions in E major